Koestijah (EYD: Kustiah), who commonly published as Rara Koestijah ("the girl Koestijah") was a Javanese language writer of the Dutch East Indies known primarily for the short stories she published in the 1930s and early 1940s in the magazine . Her short stories dealt with themes of interpersonal moral conflicts, class difference, and marriage.

Biography 
Little is known about Koestijah's background, education, or early life, except that she was of Javanese ethnicity and was probably born in the 1910s.

That magazine published a number of other Javanese women writers in that era, including Sri Koesnapsijah, Rara Sudarmin, Anggrahini, Elly, Srikanah K., Sri Melati, and Sri Marhaini. At that time it was still rare for Indonesian women to have their writings published; the first Indonesian women novelists were only published in the mid-1930s (figures such as Suwarsih Djojopuspito, Saadah Alim, Sariamin Ismail, and Fatimah Hasan Delais), although women journalists such as Ruhana Kuddus had been printed since the 1910s.

Her stories often dealt with interpersonal relations and anxiety about status.

During the Japanese occupation of the Dutch East Indies and after Indonesian independence, it is unclear if she continued to write and publish.

References

Javanese people
20th-century Indonesian women writers
Date of birth unknown
Date of death unknown
20th-century births